Amanda Knight (born 21 April 2000) is a Barbadian netball player who represents Barbados internationally and plays in the positions of wing attack, centre and wing defense. She made her maiden World Cup appearance representing Barbados at the 2019 Netball World Cup.

References 

2000 births
Living people
Barbadian netball players
2019 Netball World Cup players
Netball players